The Federal Commission for Protection against Health Risks (in Spanish, Comisión Federal para la Protección contra Riesgos Sanitarios, Cofepris) is a regulatory body of the Mexican government. It is a decentralized organ of (and supervised by) the Mexican Secretariat of Health, and is responsible for regulating a variety of health related topics in Mexico, including food safety, pharmaceutical drugs, medical devices, organ transplants, and environmental protection.

References

See also
Food and Drug Administration (Similar organization in the United States)
 Health Canada (Similar organization in Canada)

Medical and health organizations based in Mexico
National agencies for drug regulation